Monarda didyma, the crimson beebalm, scarlet beebalm, scarlet monarda, Eau-de-Cologne plant, Oswego tea, or bergamot, is an aromatic herb in the family Lamiaceae, native to eastern North America from Maine west to Ontario and Minnesota, and south to northern Georgia. Its odor is considered similar to that of the bergamot orange, which is used to flavor Earl Grey tea. The genus name comes from Nicolas Monardes, who described the first American flora in 1569.

Description
The leaves are minty fragrant when crushed. It grows in dense clusters along stream banks, moist thickets, and ditches, blooming for about 8 weeks from early/mid to late summer.

Ecology
This plants attracts hummingbirds and is a larval host to the hermit sphinx, orange mint moth, and the raspberry pyrausta.

Cultivation and uses
Crimson beebalm is extensively grown as an ornamental plant, both within and outside its native range; it is naturalized further west in the United States and also in parts of Europe and Asia. It grows best in full sun, but tolerates light shade and thrives in any moist, but well-drained soil. Several cultivars have been selected for different flower color, ranging from white through pink to dark red and purple.

Beebalm has a long history of use as a medicinal plant by many Native Americans, including the Blackfoot. The Blackfoot people recognized this plant's strong antiseptic action, and used poultices of the plant for skin infections and minor wounds. An herbal tea made from the plant was also used to treat mouth and throat infections caused by dental caries and gingivitis. Beebalm is a natural source of the antiseptic thymol, the primary active ingredient in modern commercial mouthwash formulas. The Winnebago used an herbal tea made from beebalm as a general stimulant. It was also used as a carminative herb by Native Americans to treat excessive flatulence. The Native Americans of Oswego, New York, made the leaves into a tea, giving the plant one of its common names.

References

didyma
Flora of the Eastern United States
Flora of Eastern Canada
Plants described in 1753
Taxa named by Carl Linnaeus